Lynn White (born August 6, 1953) is an American soul blues singer and songwriter. Between 1978 and 2006, she released fourteen albums, three compilation albums, and numerous singles.  Her best known song is "I Don't Ever Wanna See Your Face Again" (1982). White had a subtle dulcet voice when compared to her contemporaries harsher tones.

Life and career
White was born in Mobile, Alabama, United States. She started singing in her local church aged six, and launched her professional career in the late 1970s. In her teens, White had a part-time job at a record store and sang along to whatever record was playing.  She was promoted to become the store manager when its owner, Ike Darby, realised her singing potential. Her debut single was 1978's "Pains In My Heart" on Darby Records. "I Didn't Make My Move Too Soon" followed, before recording her debut album, Am I Too Much Woman For You, basically a collection of her single releases to that point, which was issued in 1981.  White's 1982 single "I Don't Ever Wanna See Your Face Again" was heard by the record producer Willie Mitchell, and he reissued the cut on his own Waylo Records. Her next album, Blues in My Bedroom, was released the same year on Waylo, and she remained with that label for the rest of the 1980s. White released seven albums on Waylo, including Love & Happiness, which contained the modern sounding, mid-tempo number, "See You Later, Bye".

In 1990, White moved on and formed her own label which issued The New Me that year. At her creative peak in the early to mid-1990s, she started to write some of her material, such as "Draw The Line" on The New Me. Further independent albums such as Home Girl (1991) and Cheatin''' (1993) ensued, with White getting executive producer credits on the latter. Her 12" single, "I Don't Know Why", became a notable track on the UK modern soul scene. White's work during this period was an influence on Syleena Johnson, and White cut a duet with Willie Clayton, a medley of "Slow and Easy" / "Take Me to the Mountain". In September 1994, White supported Little Milton in concert in Chicago, Illinois. Two further low key albums were issued in the mid to late-1990s, before White seemingly stopped recording and performing.

Two compilation discs, 1996's At Her Best and 2001's More of the Best'', contained selections of her most popular work.

Personal life
She became married to Ike Darby and, in 1987, they relocated to Memphis, Tennessee. Darby died on September 6, 1988.

Discography

Albums

Compilation albums

See also
List of soul-blues musicians
List of electric blues musicians

References

External links
Discogs.com

1953 births
Living people
American blues singers
American soul singers
American women singers
Soul-blues musicians
Songwriters from Alabama
Singers from Alabama
People from Mobile, Alabama
21st-century American women